The Maly Anyuy (maly meaning "little") is a river in the Kolyma basin in the Russian Far East. Most of the basin of the Maly Anyuy and its tributaries belongs to the Chukotka Autonomous Okrug administrative region of Russia.

Geography
The Maly Anyuy flows roughly westwards, south and west of the Ilirney Range, making a wide bend by the Chuvanay Range —flowing first northwards and then westwards again at the feet of the Kyrganay Range— in western Chukotka Autonomous Okrug. Just after crossing into the Sakha Republic, it meets the Bolshoy Anyuy, merging with it into a single channel (Anyuy proper)  before meeting the Kolyma close to its delta.

The most important inhabited localities in the Maly Anyuy valley are Aliskerovo and Bilibino, on the shores of smaller tributaries.

Fauna
Among the fish found in the Maly Anyuy are different species of trout, salmon and golets (голец), as well as the peled.

References

External links
   
 Bilibino nuclear plant

Rivers of Chukotka Autonomous Okrug
Rivers of the Sakha Republic